Terrestrial habitat may refer to:

Terrestrial animal, animals that live predominantly or entirely on land .
Terrestrial plant, plants that live predominantly or entirely on land .
Terrestrial ecology (also known as soil ecology), the study of the interactions among soil organisms, and between biotic and abiotic aspects of the soil environment.
Terrestrial ecoregion, land ecoregions, as distinct from freshwater and marine ecoregions.
Terrestrial ecosystem, an ecosystem found only on landforms.
Terrestrial locomotion, movement among animals adapted from aquatic to terrestrial environments.
Terrestrial planet, a planet that is composed primarily of silicate rocks or metals.